Letters to Santa 2, is a 2015 Polish-language romantic comedy film, directed by Maciej Dejczer, that is a sequel to 2011 Letters to Santa film by Mitja Okorn. The action takes place during a Christmas Eve, and follows the lives of characters from the first film, focusing on various aspects of love as shown through separate stories involving a wide variety of individuals, many of whom are shown to be interlinked as the tales progress. As same as in the first film, its plot refers to the 2003 romantic comedy Love Actually, though the events of differ in those films. The movie was produced by TVN, and distributed by Kino Świat. It was filmed in Warsaw, Poland, and premiered on 13 November 2015.

Cast 
 Maciej Stuhr as Mikołaj Konieczny
 Roma Gąsiorowska as Doris
 Tomasz Karolak as Melchior "Mel Gibson", Kazik's father
 Agnieszka Dygant as Karina Lisiecka, Szczepan's ex-wife
 Piotr Adamczyk as Szczepan Lisiecki, Karina's ex-husband
 Agnieszka Wagner as Małgorzata, Wojciech's wife
 Wojciech Malajkat as Wojciech, Małgorzata's husband
 Paweł Małaszyński as Wladi, Santa Claus Agency menager, Tomek's boyfriend
 Marcin Stec as Tomek, Wladi's boyfriend
 Katarzyna Zielińska as Betty, Małgorzata's sister, Kazik's mother
 Katarzyna Bujakiewicz as "Larwa", Doris's friend
 Jakub Jankiewicz as Kostek Konieczny, Mikołaj's son
 Ariana Kupczyński as Wiktoria, Kostek's girlfrind
 Julia Wróblewska as Tosia, adopted daughter of Małgorzata and Wojciech
 Anna Matysiak as Majka, daughter of Karina and Szczepan
 Maciej Zakościelny as Robert "Redo" Bartosiewicz
 Jan Sączek as Antoś
 Małgorzata Kożuchowska as Antoś's mother
 Jan Cięciara as Kuba, Antoś's older brother
 Marcin Perchuć as Karol, Betty's boyfriend
 Magdalena Lamparska as Magda, Santa Clause Agency worker
 Nikodem Rozbicki as Sebastian, Majka's boyfriend
 Marta Żmuda Trzebiatowska as Monika, Redo's girlfriend
 Mateusz Winek as Kazik, Betty's and Melchior's son
 Waldemar Błaszczyk as Antoś's father
 Katarzyna Chrzanowska as Magda's mother
 Sławomir Holland as Magda's father
 Małgorzata Pieczyńska as Monika's sister
 Krzysztof Stelmaszyk as Monika's father
 Piotr Głowacki as the passerby

Sequels
The movie has three sequels, Letters to Santa 3 in 2017, Letters to Santa 4 in 2021, and Letters to Santa 5 in 2022.

See also
 List of Christmas films

References

External links
 

2015 films
2010s Polish-language films
Polish romantic comedy films
2010s Christmas comedy films
Films set in Warsaw
Films about families
Films about online dating
Films about suicide
Polish Christmas films
2015 romantic comedy films